William Alvah Rublee (March 16, 1861 – April 15, 1910) was an American Consul General, journalist and editor.

Rublee was born in Madison, Wisconsin. Rublee's father was Horace Rublee, who was also a journalist and ambassador. The younger Rublee attended Phillips Exeter Academy, Harvard College (Class of 1883, degree in French and German) and Harvard Law School (class of 1885).

Rublee returned to Milwaukee after finishing law school, becoming the Milwaukee Journal Sentinel political editor. Eventually he became the vice president and director. Benjamin Harrison appointed him Consul General of the United States to Prague (then in Bohemia) on June 6, 1890. He retired on November 9, 1893. William McKinley and Theodore Roosevelt appointed him Consul General at Hong Kong (March 2, 1901), Havana, Cuba (September 15, 1902), Vienna, Austria (March 26, 1903), and then again at Hong Kong (May 17, 1909).

Rublee died in Hong Kong at the age of 49 on April 15, 1910 of peritonitis. His remains were repatriated to Seattle, Washington on a steamer and then taken to Madison, Wisconsin for burial.

References

See also
George Rublee, his brother 

Harvard College alumni
Harvard Law School alumni
Consuls general of the United States in Hong Kong and Macau
Phillips Exeter Academy alumni
19th-century American newspaper editors
1861 births
1910 deaths
Deaths in Hong Kong
People from Madison, Wisconsin